Muhammad Khalil bin Abdul Hadi is a Malaysian politician and currently serves as Deputy of Terengganu State Executive Councillor.

Background
Muhammad Khalil Abdul Hadi was born on March 20, 1977 in Marang, Terengganu. He was the eldest of 14 siblings. His father is the seventh PAS President and Marang MP Tan Sri Dato' Seri Haji Abdul Hadi Awang and his mother is Puan Sri To' Puan Seri Hajah Zainab Awang Ngah.

Education
He obtained his primary education in the Rusila National School in Terengganu and is a graduate of Al-Iman University, Yemen in which he is majoring a bachelor's degree in Islamic and Shariah Studies. In addition, he also graduated with a master's degree in Islamic Studies from the University of Portsmouth, United Kingdom. On October 30, 2022, he graduated from Universiti Sultan Zainal Abidin with a doctorate degree.

Politics
He has been involved in politics since 2006 after graduating from Al-Iman University, Yemen. Among the positions he held in PAS were PAS Youth Chief of Rusila Branch, PAS Youth Chief of Rhu Rendang, Marang PAS Youth Chief, Information Chief of PAS Marang, PAS Youth Deputy Chief (2013-2017) and PAS Youth Chief (2017-2019).

Selected as PAS Youth Chief
Muhammad Khalil Abdul Hadi has won the party's Youth chief position without contesting at the PAS Annual Mansion in Kedah. He took over the post from former incumbent Ustaz Nik Abduh Nik Aziz. The result of the party election was announced by Election Committee Chairman Datuk Wan Mutalib Embong at the 58th PAS Malaysia Youth Assembly Muktamar.

Election Results

References

Living people
People from Terengganu
Malaysian people of Malay descent
Malaysian Muslims
Malaysian Islamic Party politicians
Members of the Terengganu State Legislative Assembly
Terengganu state executive councillors
21st-century Malaysian politicians
1977 births